General elections were held in Montserrat on 8 September 2009, two years earlier than constitutionally necessary. The Movement for Change and Prosperity (MCAP) gained a parliamentary majority with six of the nine seats, while the outgoing Chief Minister, Lowell Lewis (formerly of the Montserrat Democratic Party but campaigning as an independent), and two other independents won the other seats. Reuben Meade of the MCAP was sworn in as Chief Minister on 10 September 2009.

Campaign
A total of 24 candidates contested the elections; the MCAP was the only party to run a full slate of nine candidates, whilst the Montserrat Labour Party nominated three candidates, the Montserrat Reformation Party two and the Funny Ways Party one. The remaining nine candidates were independents.

Results

References

Elections in Montserrat
Montserrat
General election
Montserrat
September 2009 events in North America